The Ministry of African Cooperation and Integration (French: Ministère de la Coopération et de l'Intégration africaine) is a Guinean government ministry whose most recent minister is Amadou thierno Diallo.

The ministry is associated with the Ministry of Foreign Affairs, International Cooperation, African Integration and Guineans abroad (French:Ministère des affaires étrangères, de la coopération internationale, de l'Intégration africaine et des guinéens de l'étranger).

Officeholders since 2010

References

Politics of Guinea
Government ministries of Guinea